World Billiards (Limited) was founded in November 2011 as a subsidiary of the World Professional Billiards & Snooker Association (WPBSA). It includes former members of EBOS (English-Billiards Open Series) and WPBSA, and is the governing body for English billiards.

As of 2012, the distinction between professional and amateur players was removed and the WPBSA World Professional Billiards Championship became simply the World Billiards Championship. Tournaments are now held in modern short multiple game format, long single game format and the more traditional timed format.

Promotional activities
Since 2012 World Billiards has organised the World Billiards Championship (English billiards) plus up to 20 other world ranking tournaments per year. Apart from the World Championship, other major ranking tournaments include the American Cup in Canada, the European Open, the Pacific International in Australia and the Asian Grand Prix in Singapore.

World Billiards Championships

See also 
 English billiards
 World Billiards Championship (English billiards)
 World Professional Billiards & Snooker Association

References

External links
 World Billiards Official website
 World Billiards Results website
 World Professional Billiards & Snooker Association (WPBSA) Official website
 Official Rules of English Billiards

English billiards
Snooker governing bodies
Snooker in the United Kingdom